Trady (born January 10, 1982), is a Chinese producer and singer-songwriter. She released her debut album Trady 1.0 in 2020. The album received a nomination for "Best Electronic Music Album" at the CMIC Music Awards. Its first song, "Break to Live", "incorporates a large number of modern retro synth sounds, and the Synthwave synth wave is strong and impactful, giving people a sense of power from the inside out". During the 13th Chinese Music Awards, she received a nomination for "Best Mandarin Female Newcomer Award". In October 2021, She released her single titled "Dare to Live" as the promotional song for 2021 Summer World University Games.

According to Toutiao, before she began her career as a singer, she was known as a "gold medal female producer" for making numerous well-known songs for singers including Jane Zhang, Han Geng, Yao Beina, and Yisa Yu.

Her husband is the musician Wan Jiaming.

Studio albums 

 Trady 1.0 (2020)

Awards

References 

1982 births
Living people
Chinese women singer-songwriters
Singers from Jilin